Troy Robert Sadowski (born December 8, 1965) is a former American football tight end in the National Football League. He played college football at Georgia. A 6th round selection (145th overall) of the 1989 NFL Draft, Sadowski played for the Atlanta Falcons (1990), the Kansas City Chiefs (1991), the New York Jets (1992–1993), the Cincinnati Bengals (1994–1996), the Pittsburgh Steelers (1997–1998), and the Jacksonville Jaguars (1998).

1965 births
Living people
Players of American football from Atlanta
American football tight ends
Georgia Bulldogs football players
Atlanta Falcons players
Kansas City Chiefs players
New York Jets players
Cincinnati Bengals players
Pittsburgh Steelers players
Chicago Bears players
Jacksonville Jaguars players